The Venerable  James Rowland Walkey  CBE, was an amateur sportsman in the first half of the twentieth century who later became an eminent Anglican Chaplain.

He was born into a military family on 10 April 1880 and educated at Plymouth College and Christ's College, Cambridge. During his varsity years he was awarded a Blue for Rugby and, after joining the British Army as a chaplain, was its 100-yard champion in 1906. In that year he married Bijou Frances Paske daughter of the Colonel Commandant of the Notts and Derbyshire Regiment with whom he had one son and six daughters.  He was mentioned in despatches during World War I and at its conclusion joined the fledgling Royal Air Force Chaplaincy Service. After serving at Uxbridge (during which time he became its Fencing champion) he held posts
in Iraq and the Middle East before becoming an Honorary Chaplain to the King and eventually its Archdeacon (Chaplain-in-Chief). Later he held incumbencies at Wateringbury, Worting, Angmering, Haversham and Moreton. He retired just a year before his death on 8 January 1960.

Notes and references

1880 births
1960 deaths
People educated at Plymouth College
Alumni of Christ's College, Cambridge
Cambridge University R.U.F.C. players
Honorary Chaplains to the King
Commanders of the Order of the British Empire
Royal Air Force Chaplains-in-Chief
World War I chaplains
World War II chaplains
Royal Army Chaplains' Department officers